Nina Shipman (born August 15, 1938) is a retired American film and television actress. Shipman is a member of the Shipman show business family.

Early years
Shipman is the daughter of screenwriter Barry Shipman and dancer and film actress Gwynne Shipman. Her grandfather Ernest Shipman was a member of one of the first Shakespearean touring companies in the United States, and her grandmother, Nell Shipman, was a silent film actress.

She attended Maddox Academy in Mexico City and Eagle Rock High School in Los Angeles, California. Shipman graduated from California State University, Los Angeles, with a degree in music. She enhanced her acting skills at the Pasadena Playhouse, in film industry workshops, and by studying under acting coach Sanford Meisner.

Educational television
In 1981, Shipman was host of Contemporary Health Issues, a series consisting of 30 half-hour episodes that could be used by students to earn credits at participating colleges and universities. The series' topics included death, sexuality, drugs, cardiovascular disease, alcoholism, and cancer.

Book
Shipman is the author of How to Become an Actor in Television Commercials (1975).

Personal life
Shipman has been married three times. Her first husband was Richard Harrington, from 1956 until their divorce in 1958, her second was actor and stuntman C. Ransom Walrod from 1961 until their divorce in 1973. Her third husband was Donald Merrill Bremer, from 1975 until his death in 2015. They lived in Hawaii. Her daughter Lani Bremer is an actress.

Selected filmography

 Official Detective (1958, TV series, in episode "Murder In A ") - Sally 
 Vertigo (1958) - Woman in Museum Mistaken for Madeleine (uncredited)
 The Hunters (1958) - WAF Lieutenant (uncredited)
 In Love and War (1958) - Nurse (uncredited)
 Compulsion (1959) - Girlfriend (uncredited)
 Say One for Me (1959) - Fay Flagg
 Blue Denim (1959) - Lillian Bartley
 The Oregon Trail (1959) - Prudence Cooper
 The Man Who Understood Women (1959) - Minor Role (uncredited)
 Wake Me When It's Over (1960) - Minor Role (uncredited)
 High Time (1960) - Laura Howard
 77 Sunset Strip  (TV series 1958–1964) "The Hamlet Caper" (S3EP17, January 6, 1961) – Darlene Wells; "The Lady Has The Answer" (S4EP5, October 20, 1961) Rita Yale
 Straightaway (TV series, 1961–1962) "The Bribe" (S1EP13, December 29, 1961) – Laurie
 Ichabod and Me (TV series, 1961–1962) "Bob's Award" (S1EP29, April 17, 1962) – Lois Wainwright
 Bonanza (TV series, 1962) Episode: "The Mountain Girl" - Trudy Coombs-Harker
 The Munsters (TV series, 1964–1966) - the Beautiful Woman in "Lily Munster, Girl Model" (season 1, episode 33)
 Rawhide (TV series) appearing as Marion Curtis, a blind woman, in the 1962 episode, "Incident of the Portrait."
 Rawhide (TV series) appearing as Valley Rose, in the 1963 episode, "Incident of the Rawhiders"
 Daniel Boone  (TV series, 1964–1970) Molly in "The Sisters O'Hanrahan"
 Perry Mason 1965 as Maxine Nichols murder victim / as Carol Olin S9E4
 The Andy Griffith Show – appearing as county nurse Irene Fairchild, in the 1966 episode “The County Clerk” (season 6, episode 26).
The Beverly Hillbillies (TV series 1965 Season 4 #7) -As Linda Curry

References

Bibliography
 Pitts, Michael R. Western Movies: A Guide to 5,105 Feature Films. McFarland, 2012.

External links
 

1938 births
Living people
American film actresses
American television actresses
Actresses from Los Angeles
20th-century American actresses
Shipman family
21st-century American women